This is a list of heritage, historic or simply notable older buildings that were demolished or lost due to fire or other causes in what is now Toronto, Ontario, Canada. In some cases, facades or portions of the original buildings have been retained or reconstructed.

York and earlier
Prior to the establishment of Upper Canada in 1791, the area was first inhabited by indigenous peoples. In the 1600s, the area was inhabited by Iroquois bands, but by 1700, Mississaugas had established themselves on the north shore of Lake Ontario, and the Iroquois were no longer resident. The French regime set up forts to trade with the First Nations from 1720 and later, until the British conquest in 1763. The town of York was established in 1793 after the Toronto Purchase of 1787 from the Mississaugas.

Toronto buildings
Toronto was established in 1834.

See also
 Guild Park and Gardens
 List of oldest buildings and structures in Toronto

References
Bibliography
 
 
 
 

Notes

External links
 Biographical Dictionary of Architects in Canada  – biographies of Canadian architects and lists of their buildings from 1800 to 1950
 Toronto in 1837 – A Model City
 Colborne Lodge and buildings associated with surveyor John Howard
 TO Built – Architectural Conservancy of Ontario 
 University of Toronto Capital Projects

Lost buildings and structures
Toronto lost buildings
Lost buildings and structures